Mathcore is a dissonant style of music characterized by rhythmic complexity and tempo changes (such as those found in free jazz and math rock) with the aggressiveness of hardcore punk and extreme metal. The genre is sometimes considered a subgenre of metalcore. Notable mathcore bands are listed here in alphabetical order.

List

See also
 List of deathcore bands
 List of grindcore bands
 List of hardcore punk bands
 List of math rock bands
 List of metalcore bands

References

Mathcore
Lists of metalcore bands